Cuza Hotta was a Romanian diplomat of Aromanian origin. At the end of the 1940s, Hotta was investigated by the Central Intelligence Agency, which considered him a communist and a fighter for a Vlach state in the Balkans.

Biography 
According to the information report of the CIA, Cuza Hotta was born in Macedonia but moved to Romania where he became a member of the Iron Guard death squads. He was an active propagandist of the idea for an autonomous Aromanian state in Greece.

A witness stated for the report that Hotta was sent to Greece by the Germans as an agent provocateur, where his function was a Press Attaché of the Romanian Legation in Athens. Greek authorities wanted to deport him back to Romania but the Germans refused to allow that.

After the liberation of Greece in 1945, Cuza Hotta was deported to Istanbul, Turkey. There, US agents concluded that he was in contact with the Russians who offered him to get back to Bucharest and help organize a Romanian bloc of Aromanians with the goal to successfully incorporate them in the Balkan Federation.

References 

Romanian communists
Romanian diplomats
Romanian people of Aromanian descent